This list is of the Cultural Properties of Japan designated in the category of  for the Circuit of Hokkaidō.

National Cultural Properties
As of 1 October 2016, six Important Cultural Properties have been designated, being of national significance.

Prefectural Cultural Properties

Municipal Cultural Properties
As of 1 May 2016, twenty-nine properties have been designated at a municipal level.

See also
 Cultural Properties of Japan
 List of National Treasures of Japan (historical materials)
 List of Historic Sites of Japan (Hokkaidō)
 Hokkaido Museum

References

External links
  Cultural Properties in Hokkaido

Cultural Properties,historical materials
Historical materials,Hokkaido